Gordon Forbes  (21 February 1934 – 9 December 2020) was a South African professional tennis player and author. Forbes won the singles title of the South African Championships in 1959 and 1961 and was runner-up in 1955, 1962, 1963 and 1964. He won the Tuscaloosa Grass Court Invitational in 1962, defeating Rod Laver in the final. During the 1950s and 1960s, he was the doubles partner of countryman Abe Segal. They were considered one of the best doubles teams in the world.

Career
Forbes learnt to play tennis in his childhood on the family farm. At age 12, he played and won his first junior tournament in East London.

Forbes won the singles title of the South African Championships in 1959 and 1961 and was runner-up in 1955, 1962, 1963 and 1964. He won the Tuscaloosa Grass Court Invitational in 1962, defeating reigning U.S. No. 1 Whitney Reed in a marathon semifinal, and World No. 1 Rod Laver in a close four set final. He played for the South African Davis Cup team in 14 ties in the period 1955 to 1963 and compiled a record of 20 wins and 11 losses.

Later life
After retiring from tennis, Forbes wrote three books about his experiences as a player, his contemporaries in the sport and other tennis topics. He died from COVID-19 on 9 December 2020, at age 86, during the COVID-19 pandemic in South Africa.

Grand Slam finals

Doubles (1 runner-up)

Mixed doubles (1 title)

Bibliography

References

External links 
 
 
 

South African male tennis players
French Championships (tennis) champions
Sportspeople from Cape Town
1934 births
2020 deaths
Grand Slam (tennis) champions in mixed doubles
Tennis writers
White South African people
Deaths from the COVID-19 pandemic in South Africa
People from Burgersdorp